Panaphelix asteliana is a moth of the family Tortricidae. It was first described by Otto Herman Swezey in 1932. It is endemic to the Hawaiian island of Oahu.

The larvae feed on Astelia veratroides. The larva is greenish with some fuscous marks on the head and the cervical shield. It feeds beneath a web on apical parts of the leaf of the host plant. The leaf is partially eaten on a transverse line on the lower side. The apical portion then bends down and this is the part on which the larva feeds, eating off the under surface and leaving the extreme apical portion rolled and spun together for a retreat which eventually becomes filled with frass.

The pupa is brown and about 15 mm long.

External links

Archipini
Endemic moths of Hawaii
Moths described in 1932